Jasieniec may refer to the following places:
Jasieniec, Lublin Voivodeship (east Poland)
Jasieniec, Grójec County in Masovian Voivodeship (east-central Poland)
Jasieniec, Świętokrzyskie Voivodeship (south-central Poland)
Jasieniec, Kozienice County in Masovian Voivodeship (east-central Poland)
Jasieniec, Sochaczew County in Masovian Voivodeship (east-central Poland)
Jasieniec, Wyszków County in Masovian Voivodeship (east-central Poland)
Jasieniec, Greater Poland Voivodeship (west-central Poland)
Jasieniec, Silesian Voivodeship (south Poland)
Jasieniec, Lubusz Voivodeship (west Poland)
Jasieniec, Pomeranian Voivodeship (north Poland)
Jasieniec, Warmian-Masurian Voivodeship (north Poland)